An okrug or okruha is one of a series of special administrative divisions of the Ukrainian Soviet Socialist Republic that were part of three oblasts and existed from 1933 to 1937 (some to 1938). Most of them were border administrative units that existed along the western border of the Soviet Union.

List of okrugs
Most of okrugs existed within the Vinnytsia Oblast. Special agricultural okrug centered in Starobilsk existed within the Donetsk Oblast. The border okrugs from 1935 to 1937, while the Starobilsk okrug existed in 1933-1938.

Vinnytsia Oblast
 Kamianets-Podilsky Okrug
 Mohyliv-Podilsky Okrug
 Proskuriv Okrug
 Shepetivka Okrug

Kiev Oblast
 Korosten Okrug
 Novohrad-Volynsky Okrug

Donetsk Oblast
 Starobilsk Okrug

References

Former subdivisions of Ukraine
Ukrainian Soviet Socialist Republic